Svitlana Valeriïvna Matevusheva (born July 22, 1981 in Sevastopol, Ukrainian SSR)  is a Ukrainian sailor. She won the Silver medal in the 2004 Summer Olympics in Athens  in the Yngling class  along with Ganna Kalinina and Ruslana Taran.

References

1981 births
Olympic sailors of Ukraine
Ukrainian female sailors (sport)
Sailors at the 2004 Summer Olympics – Yngling
Olympic silver medalists for Ukraine
Olympic medalists in sailing
Living people
Sportspeople from Sevastopol
Medalists at the 2004 Summer Olympics
21st-century Ukrainian women